Senator Cronin may refer to:

A. L. Cronin (1902–1974), Illinois State Senate
Barth S. Cronin (1858–1933), New York State Senate
Daniel Cronin (born 1959), Illinois State Senate